Waltraud Dietsch, née Birnbaum (born 26 November 1950 in Staßfurt, East Germany) is a retired German sprinter who specialized in the 400 metres.

She won a gold medal in 4x400 metres relay at the 1974 European Championships, together with teammates Angelika Handt, Ellen Streidt and Brigitte Rohde. She had finished fifth in the same event at the 1969 European Championships.

In the individual event she won a silver medal at the 1973 European Indoor Championships and a bronze at the 1974 European Indoor Championships.

She competed for the club SC Magdeburg during her active career.

1950 births
Living people
People from Staßfurt
East German female sprinters
Sportspeople from Saxony-Anhalt
European Athletics Championships medalists
Recipients of the Patriotic Order of Merit in bronze